Daniel Ríos may refer to:

Daniel Andrés Ríos (born 1983), Argentine footballer
Daniel Ríos (footballer, born 1995) (born 1995), Mexican footballer
Danny Rios (born 1972), Spanish baseball pitcher
Danny Ríos (born 2003), Salvadoran footballer